Georg-Hans Reinhardt (1 March 1887 – 23 November 1963) was a German general and war criminal during World War II. He commanded the 3rd Panzer Army from 1941 to 1944, and Army Group Centre in 1944 and 1945, reaching the rank of colonel general (Generaloberst).

Following the war, Reinhardt was tried in the High Command Trial, as part of the Subsequent Nuremberg Trials. He was found guilty of war crimes and crimes against humanity and sentenced to 15 years. He was released in 1952.

World War II
Born in 1887, Reinhardt fought during World War I. He commanded the 4th Panzer Division during the Invasion of Poland in September 1939. In the 1940 Battle of France, Reinhardt commanded the XXXXI Panzer Corps.

Operation Barbarossa

In 1941, Reinhardt and XLI Panzer Corps were deployed on the Eastern Front for Operation Barbarossa, the invasion of the Soviet Union in June. In late June Reinhardt's Corps defeated the Soviet 3rd Mechanised & 12th Mechanised Corps in the Battle of Raseiniai and destroyed over 700 Soviet tanks. His force led the advance of Army Group North to the outskirts of Leningrad in October. As all German corps on the Eastern Front, Reinhardt's corps implemented the criminal Commissar Order. According to reports from subordinate units, the order was carried out on a widespread basis. 

On October 5 Reinhardt was given command of the 3rd Panzer Army in Army Group Centre and took part in  Operation Typhoon, the advance towards Moscow. After the German defeat in the Battle of Moscow, his army was driven back by Soviet counter-attack during the winter of 1941−42. Troops under Reinhardt's command implemented the OKH policy of "liquidating" mentally infirm; in December 1941 they murdered ten mental patients in the Russian city of Kalinin, on the pretext that they posed a security threat.

Security warfare

From early 1942 until June 1944, the 3rd Panzer Army operated around Vitebsk and Smolensk. In the course of rear-security operations in the area, troops under Reinhardt command destroyed entire communities. A report of February 1943 stated:
In order to keep bands from resettling in this territory, the population of villages and farms in this area were killed without exception to the last baby. All homes were burned down.

The army engaged in deportations of civilians to concentration camps. Between September and December 1943, nearly 4,000 civilians were deported from Vitebsk and surrounding areas, because they were suspected of helping "bands" (quotation marks in the original). The action was conducted in cooperation with units of the SD; civilians, including women and children, were deported to Auschwitz concentration camp, where they died from starvation and maltreatment or were later gassed.

In June 1944, during Operation Bagration, the Third Panzer and the rest of Army Group Centre were shattered by the Red Army and driven back into Poland and East Prussia. On 16 August 1944, Reinhardt was given command of Army Group Centre. In December, renewed Soviet attacks drove Army Group Centre out of Poland into northern Prussia. Reinhardt was retired from active duty in January 1945.

Trial and conviction
In June 1945, Reinhardt was captured by the Special Air Service. In 1948, he was tried in the High Command Trial, as part of the Subsequent Nuremberg Trials. Reinhardt was found guilty of war crimes and crimes against humanity, including murder and mis-treatment of Soviet prisoners of war, and of murder, deportation, and hostage-taking of civilians in occupied countries. He was sentenced to 15 years imprisonment, and served time in the Landsberg Prison. His sentence was reviewed in January 1951, with no changes. Reinhardt was released in 1952 on compassionate grounds.

From 1954 Reinhardt served as president of the Gesellschaft für Wehrkunde (Society for Military Science), present-day  (Society for Security Policy). He was awarded the Order of Merit of the Federal Republic of Germany in 1962.

Awards
 Iron Cross (1914) 2nd Class (14 September 1914) & 1st Class (8 August 1915)
Clasp to the Iron Cross (1939) 2nd Class (21 September 1939) & 1st Class (2 October 1939)
 Knight's Cross of the Iron Cross with Oak Leaves and Swords
 Knight's Cross on 27 October 1939 as Generalleutnant and commander of 4. Panzer-Division
 Oak Leaves on 17 February 1942 as General der Panzertruppe and commander of 3. Panzergruppe
 Swords on 26 May 1944 as Generaloberst and commander of 3. Panzer-Armee
 Great Cross of Merit (24 November 1962)

References

Citations

Bibliography

External links
 

1887 births
1963 deaths
German Army generals of World War II
Colonel generals of the German Army (Wehrmacht)
Recipients of the Knight's Cross of the Iron Cross with Oak Leaves and Swords
German people convicted of crimes against humanity
Commanders Crosses of the Order of Merit of the Federal Republic of Germany
People convicted by the United States Nuremberg Military Tribunals
Recipients of the clasp to the Iron Cross, 1st class
People from Bautzen
Military personnel from Saxony